New Zealand at the 1974 British Commonwealth Games was represented by a team of 142 competitors and 33 officials. Selection of the team for the Games in Christchurch, New Zealand, was the responsibility of the New Zealand Olympic and British Commonwealth Games Association. New Zealand's flagbearer at the opening ceremony was field athlete Warwick Nicholl. The New Zealand team finished fourth on the medal table, winning a total of 35 medals, nine of which were gold.

New Zealand has competed in every games, starting with the British Empire Games in 1930 at Hamilton, Ontario.

Medal tables
New Zealand was fourth on the medal table in 1974, with a total of 35 medals, including nine gold.

Competitors
The following table lists the number of New Zealand competitors participating at the Games according to gender and sport.

New Zealanders Jane and Rebecca Perrott swam for Fiji at the games, as their father was Registrar at the University of the South Pacific. At 12½ years, Rebecca was the youngest competitor at the games.

Athletics

Track and road

Field

Combined
Men's decathlon

Women's pentathlon

Badminton

Boxing

Cycling

Road
Men's road race

Track
Men's 1000 m sprint

Men's tandem 2000 m sprint

Men's 1 km time trial

Men's 4000 m pursuit

Men's 10 miles scratch race

Diving

Lawn bowls

Shooting

Pistol

Rifle

Shotgun

Swimming

Weightlifting

Wrestling

Officials
 Team manager – Bill Holley
 Team assistant manager – Alf Haslett
 Team doctor – Graeme Campbell
 Chaperone – B. Baxter
 Physiotherapist – Peter Stokes
 Athletics
 Section manager – Johnny Borland
 Section assistant manager – Dave Leech
 Section women's manager – P. A. Munro
 Chief coach – Frank Sharpley
 No. 2 coach – Russ Hoggard
 No. 3 coach – Arthur Lydiard
 Boxing
 Section manager – C. Scott
 Trainer – Les Rackley
 Assistant trainer – R. J. Elley
 Cycling
 Section manager – D. B. Smith
 Coach – Wayne Thorpe
 Shooting section manager – C. W. Stott
 Swimming
 Section manager – Dave Gerrard
 Chief coach – Duncan Laing
 Wrestling
 Section manager – K. Scott
 Coach – Brian Stannett

See also
New Zealand Olympic Committee
New Zealand at the Commonwealth Games
New Zealand at the 1972 Summer Olympics
New Zealand at the 1976 Summer Olympics

References
Official History of the Xth British Commonwealth Games edited by A. R. Cant (2004, Christchurch)
The Commonwealth Games: the first 60 years 1930–1990 by Cleve Dheensaw (1994, Hodder & Stoughton, Canada/New Zealand)

External links
NZOC website on the 1974 games
Commonwealth Games Federation website

1974
Nations at the 1974 British Commonwealth Games
British Commonwealth Games